Raysut is a port town in southwestern Oman. It is located in the Dhofar Governorate.

History
In 1908, J.G. Lorimer recorded Rakhyut in his Gazetteer of the Persian Gulf, noting its location as being at the western extremity of Dhofar proper. He wrote:

Climate

References

Populated places in the Dhofar Governorate